This is a list of castles and chateaux located in the Moravian-Silesian Region of the Czech Republic.

A
 Alfrédova chata Chateau

B
 Bartošovice Chateau
 Bartovice Chateau
 Bělá Castle
 Bílá Chateau
 Bílovec Chateau
 Blücherův palác Chateau
 Bohumín Chateau
 Bolatice Chateau
 Brandýs Chateau
 Brantice Chateau
 Bravantice Chateau
 Bruntál Chateau
 Burkvíz Castle

C
 Chotěbuz Chateau
 Chuchelná Chateau
 Cvilín Castle
 Čeladná Castle

D
 Dětřichovice u Příbora Castle
 Dívčí Hrad Chateau
 Dobratice Chateau
 Dolní Benešov Chateau
 Dolní Bludovice Chateau
 Dolní Domaslavice Chateau
 Dolní Líštná Chateau
 Dolní Marklovice Chateau
 Dolní Soběšovice Chateau
 Dolní Suchá Chateau
 Dolní Tošanovice Chateau
 Dolní Životice Chateau
 Dorňákův kopec Castle
 Drakov Castle
 Dubová Chateau

F

 Freudenštejn Castle
 Frýdek Chateau
 Fryštát Chateau
 Fulnek Chateau
 Fulštejn Castle
 Fürstenwalde Castle

G
 Gabrielina chata Chateau

H
 Hartisov Chateau
 Hlavnice Chateau
 Hlučín Chateau
 Hnojník Chateau
 Horní Bludovice Chateau
 Horní Domaslavice Chateau
 Horní Soběšovice Chateau
 Horní Suchá Chateau
 Horní Tošanovice Chateau
 Hošťálkovice Chateau
 Hošťálkovy Chateau
 Hrabyně Chateau
 Hradec nad Moravicí Chateaucí
 Hradní vrch Castle
 Hrádek nad Olší Castle
 Hukovice Chateau
 Hukvaldy Castle
 Hukvaldy Chateau

J
 Jakartovice-Deštné Chateau
 Janovice Castle
 Janovice Chateau
 Jeseník nad Odrou Chateau
 Jezdkovice Chateau
 Jindřichov Chateau
 Jurův kámen Castle

K
 Karpentná Castle
 Kateřinice Chateau
 Klimkovice Chateau
 Klokočov Chateau
 Konská Chateau
 Kostelec Chateau
 Kravaře Chateau
 Krnov Chateau
 Kružberk Castle
 Kunčice nad Ostravicí Chateau
 Kunín Chateau
 Kyjovice Chateau

L
 Landek Castle
 Linhartovy Chateau
 Litultovice Chateau
 Lískovec u Frýdku Castle
 Loděnice Chateau
 Lovecký zámeček Chateau
 Lubno Castle

M
 Medlice Castle
 Melč Chateau
 Město Albrechtice Chateau
 Mladecko Chateau
 Moravská Ostrava Castle
 Moravský Beroun Castle
 Myslík Castle

N
 Návsí Castle
 Neplachovice Chateau
 Nová Horka Chateau
 Nová Ves Castle
 Nový Dvůr Chateau
 Nový Jičín Chateau

O
 Odry Chateau
 Oldřišov Chateau
 Opava Chateau
 Orlová Chateau

P
 Panská vyhlídka Castle
 Paskov Chateau
 Petřvald Chateau
 Polanka nad Odrou Chateau
 Poruba Chateau
 Pražmo Chateau
 Prostřední Bludovice Chateau
 Prostřední Suchá Chateau
 Prstná Chateau
 Přerovec Castle
 Příbor Castle
 Pustějov Chateau
 Pustý zámek Castle

Q
 Quinburg Castle

R

 Rabenštejn Castle
 Raduň Chateau
 Radvanice Chateau
 Raškovice Chateau
 Ráj Chateau
 Rešov Castle
 Ropice Chateau
 Rychvald Chateau
 Řepiště Castle

S
 Sedlnice Chateau
 Silesian Ostrava Castle
 Slatina Chateau
 Slavkov Castle
 Slezské Pavlovice Chateau
 Slezská Ostrava Castle
 Smolkov Chateau
 Sobkův palác Chateau
 Solca Chateau
 Sovinec Castle
 Spálov Chateau
 Stanislavice Chateau
 Stará Ves nad Ondřejnicí Chateau
 Starý Jičín Castle
 Starý Jičín Chateau
 Stěbořice Chateau
 Stonava Chateau
 Strálek Castle
 Střítež Chateau
 Studénka Chateau
 Šenov Chateau
 Šilheřovice Chateau
 Šostýn Castle
 Štandl Castle
 Štáblovice Chateau
 Štemplovec Chateau
 Šternek Castle
 Štítina Chateau
 Štramberk Castle
 Šumbark Chateau
 Švédská skála Castle

T
 Těrlicko Chateau
 Trnávka Chateau
 Třanovice Chateau
 Třebovice Chateau

V
 Vartnov Castle
 Velké Heraltice Chateau
 Velké Hoštice Chateau
 Vendryně Chateau
 Vikštejn Castle
 Vildštejn Castle
 Vítkovice Chateau
 Vratimov Castle
 Výškovice Chateau

Z
 Zábřeh nad Odrou Chateau
 Zátor Castle
 Závada Castle
 Životice Chateau

See also
 List of castles in the Czech Republic
 List of castles in Europe
 List of castles

External links 
 Castles, Chateaux, and Ruins 
 Czech Republic - Manors, Castles, Historical Towns
 Hrady.cz 

Castles in the Moravian-Silesian Region
Moravian-Silesian